The 74th New York Infantry Regiment was a Union regiment recruited in 1861, during the American Civil War.  The regiment was part of Sickles' Excelsior Brigade and their first commander was sailor and engineer Col. Charles K. Graham. The regiment participated in the Peninsula Campaign of 1862 and was particularly noted for its part at the Battle of Williamsburg. It was also present at the battles of Fredericksburg, Chancellorsville, Gettysburg and the Overland Campaign.

Four members of the regiment were awarded the Medal of Honor for their actions at the Battle of Chancellorville in May 1863, for volunteering to advance on Confederate lines under heavy fire and bring back information: privates Felix Brannigan and Joseph Gion, Corporal Gotlieb Luty, and Sergeant Major Eugene P. Jacobson.

Uniforms
Their uniform was patterned after French infantry known as chasseurs. Companies A and B however, wore a uniform modeled on the Zouaves. It consisted of a dark blue Zouave jacket with yellow trimming, a dark blue Zouave vest with yellow trimming, a sky blue sash, a red Zouave cap fez with a yellow tassel, red pantaloons with yellow trimming, deerskin jambières, and white gaiters made from canvas or drill (fabric).  The uniforms of these two Zouave companies were directly patterned after those worn by the Imperial Zouaves of France, being closer to the originals than any other Zouave style uniform worn by American Zouaves in the Civil War.

See also
List of New York Civil War units

References

External links 
 74th Infantry Regiment, New York State Military Museum
 74th Regiment, New York Infantry, National Park Service

Infantry 074
Military history of New York City
Excelsior Brigade
1861 establishments in New York (state)
Military units and formations established in 1861